Xichang Qingshan Airport  is an airport serving Xichang, the seat of Liangshan Yi Autonomous Prefecture in Sichuan Province, China.  The airport started an expansion project in February 2010.

Airlines and destinations

See also
List of airports in the People's Republic of China

References

Airports in Sichuan